Stonehurst may refer to:

 Stonehurst, Nova Scotia, Canada
 Stonehurst East, New Jersey, United States
 Stonehurst West, New Jersey, United States
 Stonehurst, also known as the Robert Treat Paine Estate
 Stonehurst, on the National Register of Historic Places listings in Brown County, Ohio
 Stonehurst Historic Preservation Overlay Zone, Los Angeles
 Stonehurst, heavy rock group from Christchurch, New Zealand